"Mission Bell" is a song written by William Michael and Jesse Hodges and performed by Donnie Brooks, with backing vocals by The Blossoms.  It reached number 7 on the U.S. pop chart in 1960.  It was featured on his 1961 album, The Happiest.

The song ranked at number 64 on Billboard magazine's Top 100 singles of 1960.

Other versions
Ronnie Hilton released a version of the song as a single in 1960 in the UK, but it did not chart.
Gary Miller released a version of the song as a single in 1960 in the UK, but it did not chart.
Jimmy Velvet released a version of the song as the B-side to his 1964 single "Teen Angel".
P. J. Proby released a version of the song on his 1965 album, P.J. Proby.
Wes Dakus' Rebels released a version of the song on their 1966 album, Wes Dakus' Rebels.
Gene Pitney released a version of the song on his 1967 album, Golden Greats.
Fleetwood Mac released a version of the song on their 1970 album, Kiln House.
Tiny Tim released a version of the song on his 1996 album, Tiny Tim's Christmas Album.

References

1960 songs
1960 singles
Gene Pitney songs
Fleetwood Mac songs
Song recordings produced by Norman Petty
His Master's Voice singles
Pye Records singles